The second election to Dyfed County Council was held in May 1985. It was preceded by the 1981 election and followed by the 1989 election. Once again, there were a number of unopposed returns, particularly in rural parts of the county.

Overview

The Independents remained the largest party but lost ground to Labour.

Ward Results (Cardiganshire)

Aberaeron No.1

Aberaeron No. 2

Aberaeron No.3

Aberystwyth No.1

Aberystwyth No.2

Aberystwyth No. 3

Aberystwyth Rural No. 1

Aberystwyth Rural No.2

Aberystwyth Rural No.3

Cardigan

Lampeter

Teifiside No.1

Teifiside No.2

Teifiside No.3

Tregaron

Ward Results (Carmarthenshire)

Ammanford No. 1

Ammanford No.2

Berwick

Burry Port East

Burry Port West

Carmarthen No. 1
The Liberal candidate had won the seat from Labour at a by-election

Carmarthen No. 2

Carmarthen No. 3

Carmarthen Rural No.1

Carmarthen Rural No.2

Carmarthen Rural No. 3

Carmarthen Rural No. 4

Carmarthen Rural No. 5

Carmarthen Rural No. 6

Carmarthen Rural No. 7

Cwmamman
The sitting member was deselected by the Labour Party but chose to contest the seat again.

Felinfoel

Hengoed

Llandeilo No.1

Llandeilo No.2

Llandeilo No.3

Llandeilo No.4

Llandeilo No.5

Llandeilo No.6

Llanedi

Llanelli No.1

Llanelli No.2

Llanelli No. 3

Llanelli No.4

Llanelli No.5

Llanelli No. 6

Llanelli No.7

Llangennech

Llan-non

Newcastle Emlyn No.1

Newcastle Emlyn No.2
The Alliance candidate had stood for Labour at the two previous elections.

Pembrey

Pontyberem

Trimsaran

Westfa

Ward Results (Pembrokeshire)

Cemaes No. 1

Cemaes No. 2

Cemaes No. 3

Fishguard and Goodwick No. 1

Fishguard and Goodwick No. 2
The sitting member was elected as an Independent in 1981

Haverfordwest No.1

Haverfordwest No. 2

Haverfordwest Rural No. 1

Haverfordwest Rural No. 2

Haverfordwest Rural No. 3

Haverfordwest Rural No. 4

Haverfordwest Rural No. 5

Milford Haven No. 1

Milford Haven No. 2

Milford Haven No. 3

Narberth No. 1

Narberth No. 2

Neyland and Llanstadwell

Pembroke No. 1

Pembroke No. 2

Pembroke No. 3

Pembroke Rural No. 1

Pembroke Rural No. 2

Tenby

References

Dyfed County Council elections
Dyfed County Council election